The 1957 Soviet football championship was the 25th seasons of competitive football in the Soviet Union and the 19th among teams of sports societies and factories. Dinamo Moscow won the championship becoming the Soviet domestic champions for the eighth time.

Honours

Notes = Number in parentheses is the times that club has won that honour. * indicates new record for competition

Soviet Union football championship

Class A

Class B (final stage)

 [Nov 17 – Dec 3, Tashkent]

Top goalscorers

Class A
Vasiliy Buzunov (CSK MO Moscow) – 16 goals

References

External links
 1957 Soviet football championship. RSSSF